Valdeconcha is a municipality in the province of Guadalajara, Castile-La Mancha, Spain. According to the 2006 census (INE), it has a population of just 48.

References 

Municipalities in the Province of Guadalajara